Gruszczyn is a hamlet near the village of Radochów, Lower Silesian Voivodeship, Poland located in the Gmina Lądek-Zdrój, Kłodzko County.<ref>Państwowy Rejestr Nazw Geograficznych – miejscowości – format XLSX. PRNG, Główny Urząd Geodezji i Kartografii. 14 May 2021.</ref>

 History 
In the 19th century, in the hamlet was located a watermill and inn, that was popular among tourists from Lądek-Zdrój heading to Radochowska Cave. The inn was popular and mentioned by travel guides at the time. After 1945, when the area was transferred from Germany to Poland, the hamlet got renamed from Richtergrund into Gruszczyn'', and remained a small agricultural settlement. In 1978, it contained 5 farms.

Between 1975 and 1998, the hamlet was located in the Wałbrzych Voivodeship. Currently, it remains left out of lists of settlements such as TERYT.

Notes

References 

Villages in Kłodzko County